Thornton Peak is a prominent mountain that rises above the Daintree Rainforest to a height of 1374 m.  The mountain is located about 80 km northwest of Cairns within the catchment of the Daintree River.

The indigenous Eastern Kuku Yalanji people's name for Thornton Peak is Wundu, and it has spiritual significance for them.

The peak is covered by rainforest and is home to a number of endemic species. Thornton Peak is one of only three mountain tops that are home to the cinereus ringtail possum.

A group of scientists have suggested the mountain is a viable candidate for the translocation of some species which require a colder climate due to climate change.

In April 2001, a missing Aero Commander 500 was found on Thornton Peak.

See also

List of mountains in Australia

References

Thornton Peak
Landforms of Far North Queensland